"Leather-Winged Bat" is an English folk song about a collection of "birds". The song's most used cast members are usually bat, a wood pecker, a blue bird, owl and turtle dove (bats, of course, technically being mammals and not birds). However, depending on the artist, the song can have different creatures, such as Peter, Paul and Mary's 1969 version which has a bat, a black bird, wood pecker, turtle dove, and a blue jay. Each "bird" has something to say about love and courtship in some sort of rhyming manner. It was recorded by Burl Ives on 31 January 1941 and released in August 1941 on the album Okeh Presents the Wayfaring Stranger. It has also been recorded by Pete Seeger, The Duhks, Bill Staines, Spider John Koerner, Peter, Paul and Mary, Kitty White, Nettles, Vicki Neville, Kim Milai, Anne Price and Warren Fremling.

References

See also
 Peter, Paul and Mommy, an album

Burl Ives songs
Peter, Paul and Mary songs